The RGO hand grenade (Ruchnaya Granata Oboronitel'naya, ("Hand Grenade Defensive")) is a defensive Soviet fragmentation hand grenade. It consists of a double layered steel pre-fragmented body. It is very similar to the single-layered offensive aluminium-bodied RGN hand grenade. It uses the UDZS dual action fuze, which has both impact and time delay functions. The impact fuze arms after a pyrotechnic delay of 1 to 1.8 seconds. If the impact fuze has not triggered the grenade after 3.2 to 4.2 seconds a second pyrotechnic delay triggers the grenade.

Unlike the two-part hemispherical RGN, the RGO is made up of 4 quadrants. One of the lower quadrants has a diamond-shaped cross-hatching in the outer shell. This is designed to help the operator to distinguish it by touch from the smooth-shelled RGN in low-light or dark conditions.

History
The RGN and RGO grenades were developed under Project BAZALT ("Basalt") during the Soviet–Afghan War to supplement the RGD-5. When in combat in the mountains Soviet troops found their grenades were less effective. The steep terrain often caused grenades to accidentally bounce or roll back towards the thrower's position and cause friendly casualties. The long fuse time allowed the enemy forces to get under cover – or even throw or knock the grenade back if they were lucky.

The RGO's time delay fuze prevents friendly casualties if it impacts too soon or will air-burst over an enemy under cover if it hadn't impacted. The impact fuze detonates when it hits any terrain – even sand, snow, or water.

The grenade is still in production in Russia and Ukraine and is in service with a number of countries.

See also
 List of Russian weaponry
 RGN hand grenade

References

 U.S. Army FM 3-23-30 APPENDIX D at GlobalSecurity.org
 Janes Infantry Weapons 1991-1992, 

Fragmentation grenades
Hand grenades of the Soviet Union